The Whitrope Tunnel is a disused railway tunnel in the Scottish Borders, situated  south of Hawick on the Waverley Route, close to Whitrope.

It is the fourth longest tunnel in Scotland.  The tunnel is on the Hawick to Carlisle part of the former line, opened in the 1860s by the North British Railway.  The Tunnel was closed in 1969 (as with the Waverley Route itself) by British Rail.

The Waverley Route Heritage Association is currently aiming to restore the tunnel to former standards and use. The tunnel is a Category B listed building and forms a key part of the former route.

In March 2002 there was a partial collapse of the tunnel roof at the south portal, followed by a major collapse in March 2021. Although it is repairable, there is no source of funding and consequently the tunnel has been sealed off for public safety.

See also
Whitrope Siding
List of places in the Scottish Borders
List of places in Scotland
List of tunnels in the United Kingdom

References

External links
 News footage of the reopening of Whitrope tunnel, 19 April 2006
 Video footage of the tunnel approach and Whitrope Siding station

Railway tunnels in Scotland
Category B listed buildings in the Scottish Borders
Tunnels in the Scottish Borders
Listed tunnels in Scotland
1860s establishments in Scotland
1969 disestablishments